Karim Mohmet Chaban (born 6 January 2000) is an Algerian professional footballer who plays as a winger for Spanish club Atlético Albacete.

Club career
Born in Marseille to Algerian parents from Oran, Chaban joined Olympique de Marseille's youth categories in 2017, from SC Air Bel. In March 2018, he agreed to a contract with RSC Anderlecht, but returned to his home country in August after signing for Gazélec Ajaccio.

In 2019, Chaban joined Portuguese side CSD Câmara de Lobos, and made his senior debut with the club in the Campeonato de Portugal. In February of the following year, he signed for Tercera División side Águilas FC.

On 4 August 2020, Chaban renewed with Águilas, but moved to UCAM Murcia CF the following 19 January, being initially assigned to the reserves in Tercera División RFEF. On 14 April 2021, he renewed his contract with the latter club until 2023, but left the club in August after not being involved with the main squad, and subsequently joined Moroccan side Difaâ El Jadida.

In 2022, after featuring rarely, Chaban returned to Spain and signed for Albacete Balompié's B-team in the regional leagues. He made his first team debut on 23 October of that year, coming on as a late substitute for Jonathan Dubasin in a 1–1 Segunda División away draw against SD Eibar.

References

External links

2000 births
Living people
Footballers from Marseille
French people of Algerian descent
French footballers
Algerian footballers
Association football wingers
Campeonato de Portugal (league) players
Segunda División players
Tercera Federación players
Tercera División players
Divisiones Regionales de Fútbol players
Águilas FC players
UCAM Murcia CF B players
Atlético Albacete players
Albacete Balompié players
Botola players
Difaâ Hassani El Jadidi players
Algeria youth international footballers
French expatriate footballers
Algerian expatriate footballers
French expatriate sportspeople in Portugal
French expatriate sportspeople in Morocco
French expatriate sportspeople in Spain
Algerian expatriate sportspeople in Portugal
Algerian expatriate sportspeople in Morocco
Algerian expatriate sportspeople in Spain
Expatriate footballers in Portugal
Expatriate footballers in Morocco
Expatriate footballers in Spain